Church of Saint Lawrence is a historic Episcopal church located at Alexandria Bay in Jefferson County, New York. It was built in 1889 and is a three-by-four-bay wood-frame Shingle Style structure on a massive, raised stone foundation.  It is composed of an entry porch, nave and chancel with symmetrical, octagonal ells housing organ pipes on the west and sacristy on the east.

It was listed on the National Register of Historic Places in 1997.

References

Churches on the National Register of Historic Places in New York (state)
Episcopal church buildings in New York (state)
Churches completed in 1889
19th-century Episcopal church buildings
Shingle Style church buildings
Churches in Jefferson County, New York
National Register of Historic Places in Jefferson County, New York
Shingle Style architecture in New York (state)